State Route 113 (SR 113) is a north-south state highway in East Tennessee.

Route description

Jefferson County

SR 113 begins as a 2-lane highway in Jefferson County east of Dandridge at an intersection with US 25W/US 70/SR 9. It then heads north and immediately has an interchange with I-40 (Exit 424). It then parallels Douglas Lake for a couple of miles before curving to the north, where it has an intersection with Nina Road, a major county road providing access to Baneberry. The highway then continues north through farmland to White Pine, where it has an intersection with SR 341. SR 113 then continues through the center of town to intersect and become concurrent with US 25E/SR 32, shortly before they cross into Hamblen County.

Hamblen County

US 25E/SR 32/SR 113 continue north to leave White Pine and go through farmland to come to an interchange with I-81 (Exit 8), where it widens to a 4-lane divided highway and enters Morristown. They continue through some industrial and rural areas to an intersection with SR 343, just shortly before SR 113 breaks off from US 25E/SR 32 as a 2-lane highway to leave Morristown and continue northeast. SR 113 continues through farmland for a few miles before having an intersection with SR 160. It continues through rolling hills and farmland to have an intersection with SR 340. The highway then turns north and winds its way into Whitesburg, where it has a very short concurrency with US 11E/SR 34/SR 66. SR 113 then continues north and crosses into Hawkins County.

Hawkins County

SR 113 winds its way through farmland and has a long concurrency with SR 344 to Saint Clair, where they split and SR 113 turns east. SR 113 then wind and curves its way east through farmland to come to an end at a y-intersection with SR 66 in Persia, just south of its intersection with SR 70.

Junction list

See also

References

113